Integrated fluidic circuit (IFC) is a type of integrated circuit (IC) using fluids.

See also
Fluidics

Biotechnology
Fluid mechanics
Integrated circuits